Emma Constable (née Chaffin; born 10 April 1975) is a retired English badminton player. Her husband Mark Constable is also a former badminton player. Emma Constable became English Junior Champion in 1992. In 1996 she won the Finnish International and the Portugal International. In 2000 she was successful at the Scottish Open, Irish Open and Iceland International. In 2001 she won the Spanish International. She participated in the 1997 and 2001 World Badminton Championships.

Achievements

IBF World Grand Prix
The World Badminton Grand Prix sanctioned by International Badminton Federation (IBF) since 1983.

Women's doubles

IBF International 
Women's doubles

Mixed doubles

References 

1975 births
Living people
English female badminton players